Posidonia are an Italian progressive pop band from Turin, formed in 2012 in Turin, Italy.

Biography
The band was formed at the end of 2012 by Alfio Minissale [Bass] and Fabrizio  Romanelli [Keyboards, Guitars], starting from several previous projects under the name of Posidonia Gardens.

2014 is the year when the band comes to a more defined style, starting from several songs, arrangements pretty heterogeneous amongst them. Cobelpot Mike (vocals) becomes a member, giving birth to the present formation which takes the name of Posidonia in 2015.

2016 is the year of change. The band will take part to several festivals and competitions in the north of Italy during September and October 2016, and it will start a collaboration with Alka Record, an Italian music label, which will bring the band to produce their first EP under a label, that will be released early in 2017. Due to some divergences of thought and about the vision of the project, Jean Louis Camilli will be supposed to leave the band after the autumn 2016 tour. The band will add a new drummer Camel Tosis [Drums] to their formation in order to reach the goal of being produced by a nationwide label.

At the beginning of November 2016, Posidonia were informed that they passed the second phase of the Tour Music Fest (an Italian nationwide music competition) and they will attend the semi-finals in Rome on 19 November.

Style
Posidonia genre is not easily identifiable and classifiable since multiple flavors and different sounds flow in its style: from 70s rock to prog-rock, from post-rock to indie music and 80s and 90s alternative music, from pop to more sophisticated and modern electronic sounds. However, the main style stream is Progressive Pop, where Posidonia can be fully identified. Pursuit, research and sperimentation in music universe is the key for Posidonia, together with linguistic and artistic sperimentation as the creativity engine of the band.

Name
Posidonia refers to Posidonia, a genus of flowering plants, widespread in the Mediterranean sea.

The first Posidonia full-length album, gets ideas from the Greek word κυρτός which in statistics represents the tailedness of the probability distribution.

Members
 Current members
 Cobelpot Mike - lead vocals, Background keyboards(2014–present)
 Fabrizio Romanelli - keyboards, Guitars, background vocals (2012–present)
 Alfio Minissale - bass guitar, background vocals (2012–present)
 Camel Tosis - drums (2016–present)

 Former members

 Luigi Carofilo - lead guitar (2013-2016)
 Jean Louis Camilli - drums (2013–2016)

Discography
 Studio albums
Kurtosis (2016)

 Singles
History is a bitch (2016)
Scratch (2016)
Ethan (2016)
Senses (2016)

References

Italian alternative rock groups
Italian indie rock groups
Indie pop groups